Scott Stamps (born 20 March 1975) is an English footballer who played as a defender for clubs including Torquay United, Colchester United and Kidderminster Harriers.

Career
Stamps started his professional football career with Torquay United in 1993 as a trainee. During his time with The Gulls, he made 86 appearances and scored 5 goals.  On 26 March 1997, he joined Colchester United for £10,000. Stamps was with The U's for just under two seasons and made 57 appearances for the club, but only managed to find the back of the net once.  In July 2001 he joined Kidderminster Harriers after a brief spell out of the game. Stamps appeared for Harriers 95 times but never managed to find the net.

Stamps was on the move again in August 2004 and joined Conference National side Tamworth. Stamps spent two seasons with The Lambs before he was released in the summer of 2006.  He subsequently played for Bromsgrove Rovers, Willenhall Town and Hednesford Town.

Honours
Kidderminster Harriers
1999–2000 Football Conference champions

External links

1975 births
Living people
People from Edgbaston
English footballers
Association football defenders
Torquay United F.C. players
Colchester United F.C. players
Kidderminster Harriers F.C. players
Tamworth F.C. players
Bromsgrove Rovers F.C. players
Willenhall Town F.C. players
Hednesford Town F.C. players
Sutton Coldfield Town F.C. players
English Football League players
National League (English football) players